ThisisRnB is an American online magazine that that covers many aspects of R&B music and industry-related news. The site publishes candid artist interviews, specialized video performances, editorials, reviews, podcasts, concert coverage and contests. 

ThisisRnB has been referenced by media outlets such as MTV, AOL, BET, VH1, Spin, Vibe, Ebony and PerezHilton.com. Georgi Todorov of Thrive My Way labeled the site as the Best R&B Blog. Michael Sandford of Pink Wafer included the site on their RnB & Soul Music Blogs You'll Love list.

History and staff 
ThisisRnB was founded by Jamie Wexler, who had previously co-founded Tapemasters Inc, a production team known for producing mixtapes. The website was launched in 2008 with a purpose to provide a reliable source that highlights and features news, music, videos, and original content that fans of the R&B genre would look to find online. Ni'Kesia Pannell, an Atlanta-based entrepreneur, is the editor-in-chief, while Brian Allonce, a record producer and audio engineer, serves as the creative director. 

On February 4, 2019, the founder Jamie Wexler announced that he had been diagnosed with cancer in October 2018. On May 20, 2019, he died at the age of 37. Following Wexler's death, his wife Kadeja Wexler  became the CEO and beauty director of ThisisRnB.

Awards 

|-
|2013
|ThisisRnB
|Soul Train Music Award for Best Entertainment/Music Website or Blog
|
|-

References

External links

American entertainment websites
American music websites
Online magazines published in the United States
Magazines established in 2008
2008 establishments in the United States
Music review websites